The Trace is first DVD live concert from South Korean rock band Nell, released on November 28, 2008. Includes the full live recording of Nell's concert "Stay" which was held at the Olympics Hall in Seoul on July 19, 2008.  Four new tracks was added into mini CD as bonus.

Track listing

DISC 1
 Down
 1:03
 Tokyo
 Moonlight Punch Romance
 현실의 현실
 섬
 Good Night
 기억을 걷는 시간
 Stay
 Fisheye Lens
 Marionette
 Minus
 Promise Me
 기생충
 Onetime Bestseller
 백색왜성
 믿어선 안될 말
 마음을 잃다
 12 Seconds

DISC 2
Practice Video, Backstage, and Interview

Mini CD
 Part 1
 Part 2
 Act 5
 Part 2 (acoustic ver.)

References 

2008 live albums
Nell (band) albums